Nadezhda Pushpasheva (born 29 December 1959) is a Russian para table tennis player. She won one of the bronze medals in the women's individual C1-2 event at the 2020 Summer Paralympics held in Tokyo, Japan.

References

External links
 

Living people
1959 births
People from Votkinsk
Russian female table tennis players
Paralympic table tennis players of Russia
Paralympic bronze medalists for the Russian Paralympic Committee athletes
Paralympic medalists in table tennis
Table tennis players at the 2020 Summer Paralympics
Medalists at the 2020 Summer Paralympics
Sportspeople from Udmurtia
20th-century Russian women
21st-century Russian women